The Chinese Academy of Tropical Agricultural Sciences  (CATAS) is an agricultural university located in Haikou City, Hainan Province, China.

The academy was founded in 1954 in Guangzhou. It later moved to Danzhou, Hainan, and then to its current location in the south part of Haikou, beside the Hainan Medical College. Today, the academy has more than 3,000 staff members, 2,000 of which are involved in research work.

References

External links
Official Website
 

Universities and colleges in Hainan
Organizations based in Haikou
1954 establishments in China